Mazzella Field is a 2,400 seat soccer-specific stadium on the campus of Iona College in New Rochelle, New York.  It is home to the Iona College Gaels soccer, rugby, and lacrosse teams, as well as the Women's New York Magic of United Women's Soccer.

First opened in 1989, it was originally used as a multi-purpose stadium that also hosted the school's football team until the program was disbanded in 2008.

The field was the site of the 2008 Empire State Games men's lacrosse championships.

In June 2017, Mazzella Field received a new FieldTurf surface striped for soccer and lacrosse.

Rugby

References

External links
Directions to Mazzella Field ICGaels.com
Hynes Athletics Center ICGaels.com

Iona Gaels football
Iona Gaels men's soccer
Iona Gaels women's soccer
College football venues
College lacrosse venues in the United States
College soccer venues in the United States
Defunct college football venues
American football venues in New York (state)
Lacrosse venues in New York (state)
Multi-purpose stadiums in the United States
Rugby union stadiums in New York (state)
Soccer venues in the New York metropolitan area
Sports in New Rochelle, New York
Sports venues in Westchester County, New York
Sports venues completed in 1989
1989 establishments in New York (state)
Rugby New York stadiums